Captive of Billy the Kid is a 1952 American Western film directed by Fred C. Brannon and starring Allan Lane, Grant Withers and Penny Edwards.

The film's sets were designed by the art director Frank Arrigo.

Plot

Cast
 Allan Lane as Marshal 'Rocky' Lane 
 Black Jack as 'Rocky's' Horse  
 Penny Edwards as Nancy McCreary  
 Grant Withers as Van Stanley  
 Clem Bevans as Skeeter Davis  
 Roy Barcroft as Henchman Piute  
 Clayton Moore as Paul Howard 
 Mauritz Hugo as Randy Brown  
 Garry Goodwin as Pete, Fake Deputy  
 Frank McCarroll as 1st Deputy Marshal  
 Richard Emory as Henchman Sam 
 Steve Clark as Telegraph Operator  
 Art Dillard as Nancy's Driver  
 Bob Reeves as Henchman

References

Bibliography
 Boggs, Johnny D. Billy the Kid on Film, 1911-2012. McFarland, 2013.

External links
 

1952 films
1952 Western (genre) films
American Western (genre) films
Films directed by Fred C. Brannon
Republic Pictures films
American black-and-white films
1950s English-language films
1950s American films